Lins Lima de Brito, known as just Lins, is a Brazilian footballer who plays as a striker or right winger.

Club career
After many loan-stints around Brazil, he found more space going into J. League, where he played for Gamba Osaka, even winning a treble with the club in 2014. He collected the strange nickname of Linswandowski in his time in Osaka, before leaving in early 2016.

In February 2019, Lins transferred to China League One side Beijing BSU.

Career statistics

Club statistics
Updated 31 December 2019.

Honours

Club
Gamba Osaka
J1 League: 2014
J.League Cup: 2014
Emperor's Cup: 2014, 2015
Japanese Super Cup – 2015

References

External links
 

 Profile at Ventforet Kofu

1987 births
Living people
Brazilian footballers
Campeonato Brasileiro Série A players
Campeonato Brasileiro Série B players
Associação Atlética Ponte Preta players
Mirassol Futebol Clube players
Criciúma Esporte Clube players
Grêmio Foot-Ball Porto Alegrense players
ABC Futebol Clube players
Gamba Osaka players
Ventforet Kofu players
FC Tokyo players
Itumbiara Esporte Clube players
Figueirense FC players
Brazilian expatriate footballers
Brazilian expatriate sportspeople in Japan
Expatriate footballers in Japan
J1 League players
J2 League players
Beijing Sport University F.C. players
China League One players
Expatriate footballers in China
Brazilian expatriate sportspeople in China
People from Camaçari
Association football wingers
Association football forwards
Sportspeople from Bahia